Leangen Ishall is an indoor ice hockey arena located in Leangen, Trondheim, Norway. The capacity of the arena is 3,000 and it was opened in 1977. It is the home arena of the Nidaros ice hockey team. The arena also hosted the home games of the Trondheim Black Panthers and Rosenborg ice hockey team.

Located next to the arena is Leangen Kunstisbane an outdoor long track artificial speed skating oval constructed in 1979.

References

External links

Indoor arenas in Norway
Indoor ice hockey venues in Norway
Sports venues in Trondheim
Speed skating venues in Norway
Rosenborg IHK
Trondheim Black Panthers
Sports venues completed in 1977
1977 establishments in Norway
Figure skating venues in Norway